José Santos Quilapán or simply Quilapán was a Mapuche chief active in the Mapuche resistance to the Occupation of Araucanía (1861–1883). He was the main chief of the Arribanos and inherited his charge as chief from his father Mañil.

References

19th-century Mapuche people
People of the Occupation of Araucanía
Indigenous leaders of the Americas
People from Araucanía Region
Lonkos